Paraíso Travel is a Colombian telenovela that premiered on RCN Televisión on 29 January 2018, and concluded on 4 May 2018 based on the book of the same name by the Colombian author Jorge Franco. It stars Laura Londoño and Sebastián Eslava as the titular's character.

Synopsis 
This series tells the story of Reina Acuña a young beautiful Colombian girl that after receives a phone call from her mother, Raquel Zuluaga, she starts looking for her in the streets of Medellín, just to find out that the women has fled to New York to die in the north.

Reina boards a new journey to the States that leads her to deal with more than a couple complicated situations while looking for her mom, such as having her visa rejected and getting in touch with an illegal migration agencie called Paraíso Travel. Through her travels she will walk into the abyss of moral borders, willing to do whatever it takes to fulfil her dreams and goals, which have no boundaries.

Themes 
This RCN's production relates to the American Dream from a Colombian perspective, to approach themes such as love, family, friends and couples. The joys, sadness and hazards of Paraíso Travel haves the streets and venues of Medellín and New York City as a stage.

The series is based in the homonymous novel by Jorge Franco as well as the 2008 movie by Simón Brand, whose soundtrack was composed by the Colombian singer and song writer Fonseca. The story covers the unreal day by day choices an immigrant has to make in order to achieve their dreams in the United States.

Cast 
 Laura Londoño as Reina Acuña
 Sebastián Eslava as Marlon Cruz
 Juan Diego Sánchez as Lucas
 Katherine Vélez as Raquel Zuluaga
 Cristian Tappan as Gonzalo Acuña
 Juan Pablo Posada as Iván
 Michel Guillo as Giovanny
 Lucho Velasco as Victor
 Mario Parra as Pastor
 Sandra Reyes as Cecilia
 Julio Sánchez as Ramón Cruz
 Carlos Kajú as Paco
 Aída Morales as Fabiola
 Marcela Benjumea as Leonor
 Nadia Rowinsky as La Caleña
 Adriana Osorio as Patricia
 Juana Arboleda as Maritza
 Carlos Congote as Jeremy
 Fiona Horsey as DEA Agent: Demi
 Fernando Arévalo as Guillermo
 Alexis Calvo as El Enano
 Mauricio Gonzalez as DEA Agent: Alex
 Franártur Duque as Bellhop
 Adriana Silva as Adriana
 Vilma Vera as Sonia Ríos

References 

Colombian telenovelas
Spanish-language telenovelas
RCN Televisión telenovelas
2018 Colombian television series debuts
2018 telenovelas
2018 Colombian television series endings
Television shows set in Medellín
Television shows set in New York City
Television shows set in Caracas
Television shows set in Guadalajara
Sony Pictures Television telenovelas